Klavdia (or ) is a village in the Larnaca District of Cyprus, located  west of Larnaca. Prior to 1974, the village was inhabited solely by Turkish Cypriots.

References

Communities in Larnaca District
Turkish Cypriot villages depopulated after the 1974 Turkish invasion of Cyprus